The discography of The Story So Far, an American rock band, consists of four studio albums, six extended plays and three singles.

Studio albums

Extended plays

Singles

Other appearances

Videography

Upside Down (2018)

See also
 List of songs recorded by The Story So Far

References
 Citations

Discographies of American artists
Pop punk group discographies